Ortochile is a genus of flies in the family Dolichopodidae. It is distributed in the Western Palaearctic realm, including Europe, Turkey, Israel and North Africa. Adults of Ortochile have greatly elongated mouthparts, longer than the height of the head. They are associated with flowers, and have been reported to feed on nectar and pollen. Flower-feeding is also known in some species of Hercostomus.

Species
Four species are included in the genus:
Ortochile barbicoxa Strobl, 1909 – Spain
Ortochile morenae (Strobl, 1899) – Morocco, Spain
Ortochile nigrocoerulea Latreille, 1809 – West and South Europe, North Africa, Middle East
Ortochile soccata Loew, 1850 – France, Italy, Malta

References

Dolichopodinae
Dolichopodidae genera
Taxa named by Pierre André Latreille
Diptera of Europe
Diptera of Asia
Diptera of Africa